The Mazari caretaker ministry under Balakh Sher Mazari as the caretaker prime minister of Pakistan was sworn into office after the Nawaz government was overthrown on 19 April 1993 by president Ghulam Ishaq Khan. Mazari's tenure as caretaker prime minister ended abruptly on 26 May 1993 when the Supreme Court revoked the presidential order and reinstated Nawaz Sharif as the prime minister.

Government formation
On 18 April 1993, president Ghulam Ishaq Khan exercised his extra-constitutional presidential powers, instituted to him through the Eighth Amendment to the Constitution of Pakistan, to resolve the power struggle in Pakistan and dismissed the government of prime minister Nawaz Sharif. After dissolving both, the national and the provincial assemblies, Khan appointed Mazari as the caretaker prime minister. The same day, a caretaker cabinet was also sworn into the house.

This was the second time that president Khan had invoked Article 58-2b of the Eighth Amendment to bring down an elected head of government. The charges of corruption and economic mismanagement that Khan levelled against Nawaz Sharif were almost entirely identical to those he had earlier brought against Benazir Bhutto in 1990.

Cabinet

1993
A caretaker cabinet of 22 ministers took an oath on 18 April 1993 under caretaker prime minister Balakh Sher Mazari and the president Ghulam Ishaq Khan. The Mazari caretaker cabinet was "[Pakistan's] most short-lived caretaker cabinet".

References

1993 establishments in Pakistan